John Peckham (c. 1230 – 8 December 1292) was Archbishop of Canterbury in the years 1279–1292. He was a native of Sussex who was educated at Lewes Priory and became a Friar Minor about 1250. He studied at the University of Paris under Bonaventure, where he would later teach theology. From his teaching, he came into conflict with Thomas Aquinas, with whom he debated on two occasions. Known as a conservative theologian, he opposed Aquinas' views on the nature of the soul. Peckham also studied optics and astronomy, and his studies in those subjects were particularly influenced by Roger Bacon and Alhazen.

In around 1270, Peckham returned to England, where he taught at the University of Oxford, and was elected the provincial minister of England (Minoriten) in 1275. After a brief stint in Rome, he was appointed Archbishop of Canterbury in 1279. His time as archbishop was marked by efforts to improve discipline in the clergy as well as reorganize the estates of his see. Pluralism, or holding more than one clerical benefice, was one of the abuses that Peckham combatted. He served King Edward I of England in Wales, where he formed a low opinion of the Welsh people and laws. Before and during his time as archbishop, he wrote a number of works on optics, philosophy, and theology, as well as writing hymns. Numerous manuscripts of his works survive. On his death, his body was buried in Canterbury Cathedral, but his heart was given to the Franciscans for burial.

Early life
Peckham came from a humble family, possibly from Patcham in East Sussex. He was born about 1230 and was educated at Lewes Priory. About 1250, he joined the Franciscan order at Oxford.  He then went to the University of Paris, where he studied under Bonaventure and became regent master, or official lecturer, in theology. While at Paris, he wrote a Commentary on Lamentations, which sets out two possible sermons.

For years Peckham taught at Paris, where he was in contact with many of the leading scholars of his time, including Thomas Aquinas. He famously debated Aquinas on at least two occasions during 1269 and 1270, during which Peckham defended the conservative theological position, and Thomas put forth his views on the soul. The Thomist doctrine of the unity of form was condemned after these debates. His theological works later were used by his pupil Roger Marston who in turn inspired Duns Scotus.

Peckham also studied other fields, however; and was guided by Robert Grosseteste and Roger Bacon's views on the value of experimental science. Where Peckham met Bacon is not known, but it would have been at either Paris or Oxford. Bacon's influence can be seen in Peckham's works on optics (the Perspectiva communis) and astronomy.
In the field of optics, Peckham was influenced by Euclid, Pseudo-Euclid, Aristotle, Augustine, al-Kindi, Avicenna, Alhazen, Grosseteste, and Roger Bacon. Of these, historian David Lindberg argues, "Alhazen is by far the most significant, and Peckham could speak of his intention to 'follow in the footsteps' of the author".

Return to England

Reorganization of the archdiocese
About 1270, he returned to England to teach at Oxford, and was elected provincial minister of the Franciscans in England in 1275. He did not long remain in that post, being summoned to Rome as lector sacri palatii, or theological lecturer at the papal palace. It is likely that he composed his Expositio super Regulam Fratrum Minorum, a work that included information on preaching, a subject that Peckham felt was of great importance. In 1279 he was appointed Archbishop of Canterbury by Pope Nicholas III who had prohibited the election of Robert Burnell, Edward I's preferred candidate. He was provided (appointed by the pope to the see) on 25 January 1279 and consecrated on 19 February 1279.

Peckham laid stress on discipline, which often resulted in conflict with his clergy. His first episcopal act was calling a council at Reading in July 1279 to implement ecclesiastical reform, but Peckham's specifying that a copy of Magna Carta should be hung in all cathedral and collegiate churches offended the king as an unnecessary intrusion into political affairs. Another ruling was on non-residence of clergy in their livings. The only exception Peckham was prepared to make on non-residence was if the clerk needed to go abroad to study. At the Parliament of Winchester in 1279, the archbishop compromised and Parliament invalidated any regulation of the council dealing with royal policies or power. The copies of Magna Carta were taken down. One reason the archbishop may have backed down was that he was in debt to the Italian banking family of the Riccardi, who also were bankers to Edward and the pope, and Peckham was under threat of excommunication from the pope unless he repaid the loans.

However, Peckham worked hard to reorganise the estates of the diocese, and held an inquiry in 1283 through 1285 into the revenues of the see. He set up administrative structures in the manors that divided them into seven administrative groups. Peckham, though, was almost continually in debt, and because he was a Franciscan, he had no personal property to help with his living expenses. He had inherited the diocesan debts that his predecessor had allowed to accumulate, and never managed to clear them.

Relations with the Welsh

Notwithstanding his other actions, Peckham's relations with the king were generally good, and Edward sent him on a diplomatic mission to Llywelyn ap Gruffudd in Wales. In 1282 he attempted to mediate between the Welsh and King Edward, but given that Edward would not budge on the main issues, it was a hopeless mission. In the end, Peckham excommunicated some of the Welsh who were resisting Edward, not unsurprising given Peckham's views of the Welsh. Peckham visited the Welsh dioceses as part of his tour of all his subordinate dioceses. While there, Peckham criticised the Welsh clergy for their unchaste lives, conspicuous consumption, and heavy drinking. He also found the Welsh clergy to be uneducated, although he did order a Welsh-speaking suffragan bishop to be appointed to help with pastoral duties in the diocese of Coventry and Lichfield. Peckham also criticised the Welsh people as a whole, contrasting their pastoral economy with the farming-based economy of England, and finding the Welsh to be lazy and idle.

As part of his diplomatic duties, Peckham wrote to Llywelyn, and in those letters the archbishop continued his criticisms of the Welsh people, this time condemning their laws as contrary to both the Old and New Testament. Peckham was particularly offended that Welsh laws sought to get parties to homicides or other crimes to settle their differences rather than the process of English law which condemned the criminal.

Peckham also had problems with his subordinate Thomas Bek, who was Bishop of St David's in Wales. Bek tried to revive a scheme to make St David's independent from Canterbury, and to elevate it to metropolitan status. This had originally been put forth by Gerald of Wales around 1200, but had been defeated by the actions of Hubert Walter, then the Archbishop of Canterbury. Bek did not manage even the four-year fight that Gerald had managed, for Peckham routed him quickly.

Ecclesiastical matters
Skirmishes with Edward over clerical privileges, royal power, Peckham's use of excommunication, and ecclesiastical taxation continued, but in October 1286, Edward issued a writ entitled Circumspecte Agatis which specified what types of cases the ecclesiastical courts could hear. These included moral issues, matrimonial issues, disputes about wills and testaments, the correction of sins, and slander and physical attacks on the clergy.

Peckham was very strict in his interpretations of canon law, and once wrote to Queen Eleanor that her use of loans from Jewish moneylenders to acquire lands was usury and a mortal sin. He also felt that Welsh laws were illogical and conflicted with Biblical teachings. He also mandated that the clerical tonsure worn by the clergy should not just include the top of the head, but also have the nape and over the ears shaved, which allowed the clergy to be easily distinguished from the laity. To help with this, the archbishop also forbade the clergy from wearing secular clothing, especially military garb. He also forbade an effort by the Benedictine order in England to reform their monastic rule, to allow more time for study and for more education for the monks. Peckham's reason was that they were against custom, but he may also have had concerns that these reforms would have drawn recruits away from the Franciscans.

At an ecclesiastical council held at Lambeth in 1281, Peckham ordered the clergy to instruct their congregations in doctrine at least four times a year. They were to explain and teach the Articles of Faith, the Ten Commandments, the Works of Mercy, the Seven Deadly Sins, the Seven Virtues and the Sacraments. This command was issued as a canon, or law, of the council, and the group is known as the Lambeth Constitutions. Even later these constitutions were collected as the Ignorantia sacerdotum. The six doctrines comprised the minimum theological knowledge the archbishop considered necessary for the laity to know. The constitutions, which were originally in Latin, were the basis and inspiration for pastoral and devotional works throughout the remainder of the Middle Ages, and were eventually translated into English in the 15th century.

The crime of "plurality," or pluralism, which was the holding by one cleric of two or more benefices, was one of Peckham's targets, as were clerical absenteeism and laxity in the monastic life. His main method of fighting these was a system of "visitation" of his subordinate dioceses and religious houses, which he used with an unprecedented frequency. This often resulted in conflicts over whether or not the archbishop had jurisdiction to conduct these visits, but Peckham was also papal legate, which added a layer of complexity to the resulting disputes. The numerous legal cases that resulted from his visitation policy strengthened the archiepiscopal court at the expense of the lower courts. Peckham also fought with Thomas de Cantilupe, Bishop of Hereford over the right to visit subordinate clergy. The quarrel involved an appeal over the jurisdiction of the archbishop, that Thomas sent to Rome in 1281, but Thomas died before the case could be decided. Peckham also decreed that the clergy should preach to their flocks at least four times a year.

Peckham often was in conflict with his subordinate bishops, mainly because of his efforts to reform them, but Peckham's own attitude and handling of his clergy contributed to the problem. He once wrote to Roger de Meyland, the Bishop of Coventry and Lichfield "These things need your attention, but you have been absent so long that you seem not to care. We therefore order you, on receipt of this letter, to take up residence in your diocese, so that—even if you are not competent to redress spiritual evils—you may at least minister to the temporal needs of the poor." The historian Richard Southern says that Peckham's disputes with his suffragan bishops were "conducted in an atmosphere of bitterness and perpetual ill-will", which probably owed something to a "petulant strain in Peckham's character". Peckham's conflicts started because his own ideals were those of a Franciscan, but most of his clergy were concerned with more mundane and materialistic affairs. These strains between the archbishop and his subordinates were intensified by clashes over ecclesiastical and secular authority, as well as Edward's great need for income.

Archbishop John Peckham was a notable anti-semite.  On 19 August 1282, in a letter to Richard Gravesend, Bishop of London, he ordered the Bishop to compel the Jews of London, using every instrument of ecclesiastical censure, to destroy all their synagogues except one within a brief time period to be determined by the Bishop.  In a second letter he congratulates the Bishop because the Judaica perfidia is being overcome by the bishop's attention and vigilance.

Death and legacy
A number of manuscripts of Peckham's works on philosophy and biblical commentary remain extant. Queen Eleanor persuaded him to write for her a scholarly work in French, which was later described as "unfortunately rather a dull and uninspired little treatise." His poem Philomena is considered one of the finest poems written in its time.

Peckham died on 8 December 1292 at Mortlake and was buried in the north transept, or the Martyrdom, of Canterbury Cathedral. His heart, however, was buried with the Franciscans under the high altar of their London church, Greyfriars, London. His tomb still survives. He founded a college at Wingham, Kent in 1286, probably a college of canons serving a church.

Works

A number of his works have survived, and some have appeared in print in various times:

 
 
 Perspectiva communis
 Collectarium Bibliae
 Registrum epistolarum
 Tractatus de paupertate
 Divinarum Sententiarum Librorum Biblie
 Summa de esse et essentia
 Quaestiones disputatae
 Quodlibeta
 Tractatus contra Kilwardby
 Expositio super Regulam Fratrum Minorum
 Tractatus de anima
 Tractatus de sphaera
 Canticum pauperis
 De aeternitate mundi
 Defensio fratrum mendicantium

Peckham is the earliest Archbishop of Canterbury to have his registers, the principal records of archiepiscopal administration, held at Lambeth Palace Library.

See also

List of Roman Catholic scientist-clerics

Notes

Citations

References

Further reading

External links
 Peckham's (1580) Perspectivae communis – digital facsimile from the Linda Hall Library

1230 births
1292 deaths
English Friars Minor
Archbishops of Canterbury
13th-century English Roman Catholic archbishops
13th-century Latin writers
Catholic clergy scientists
Burials at Canterbury Cathedral
13th-century astronomers
Medieval English astronomers
13th-century English Roman Catholic theologians

Year of birth uncertain